is a passenger railway station located in the city of Sukumo, Kōchi Prefecture, Japan. It is operated by the third-sector Tosa Kuroshio Railway.and has the station number "TK47".

Lines
Sukumo Station is a terminus of the Tosa Kuroshio Railway Sukumo Line, and is located 23.6 km from the opposing terminus of the line at

Station layout
The elevated station consists of two bay platforms serving two terminating tracks. Stairs and an elevator connect the platforms to the station office on the ground floor. This station has a Midori no Madoguchi staffed ticket office.

Adjacent stations

|-
!colspan=5|Tosa Kuroshio Railway

History
The station opened on 1 October 1997.

Services between Sukumo and Nakamura were suspended from 2 March 2005 following a collision. Local services only were resumed from 7 April 2005 between Higashi-Sukumo and Nakamura, and limited express services were restored from 13 June 2005. The line from Sukumo reopened on 1 November 2005.

Surrounding area
 National Route 56
 National Route 321
Sukumo Shell Mound

See also
 List of railway stations in Japan

References

External links
Station homepage

Railway stations in Japan opened in 1997
Railway stations in Kōchi Prefecture
Sukumo, Kōchi